Fernanda Melchor (born 1982, Veracruz, Mexico) is a Mexican writer best known for her novel Hurricane Season for which she won the 2019 Anna Seghers Prize and a place on the shortlist for the 2020 International Booker Prize.

Life and career
Melchor graduated with a degree in Journalism from the Universidad Veracruzana where she was Coordinator of Communication of the Veracruz-Del Río campus.

Melchor has published fiction and nonfiction in The Paris Review, La Palabra y el Hombre, Letras Libres, Excélsior, Replicante, Milenio semanal, Le Monde diplomatique, Vice Latinoamérica, GQ Latinoamérica and Vanity Fair Latinoamerica. She began her writing career in 2013 with the publication of Aquí no es Miami (2013), a collection of literary journalism, and Falsa Liebre (2013), her first novel.

Hurricane Season —a novel based on the murder of a witch in a small town in Melchor's home state, Veracruz—was featured as one of the best novels in Mexico in 2017 The book has been translated into German by Angelica Ammar and into English by Sophie Hughes. It won the 2020 International Literature Award of the Haus der Kulturen in Germany, and was shortlisted for the 2020 International Booker Prize.

In 2015, Melchor was included in a Conaculta's anthology as one of the featured Mexican authors under 40 years old.

In 2018, Melchor won the PEN Mexico Award for Literary and Journalistic Excellence

In 2019, Melchor was awarded the International Literature Award as well as the Anna Seghers-Preis along with the German writer Joshua Gross.

Bibliography 

 Aquí no es Miami (2013). This Is Not Miami, trans. Sophie Hughes (2023)
 Falsa liebre (2013)
 Temporada de huracanes (2017). Hurricane Season, trans. Sophie Hughes (2020)
 Páradais (2021). Paradais, trans. Sophie Hughes (2022)

Awards and honors 

 Winner of the Literary Virtuality Casa de Letras, National Autonomous University of Mexico, 2007
 Winner of the Journalism Award of the Journalism Foundation Rubén Pabello Acosta, 2009
 Winner of the Chronicle National Award Dolores Guerrero, 2011
 Winner of the Pen Club Prize for Journalistic and Literary Excellence, 2018
 Winner of the International Literature Award, 2019
 Winner of the Anna Seghers-Preis, 2019 for Hurricane Season
 Shortlisted for the International Booker Prize 2020 for Hurricane Season
Shortlisted for the Dublin International Literary Awards 2021 for Hurricane Season
 Longlisted for the International Booker Prize 2022 for Paradais

References 

Mexican women novelists
Writers from Veracruz
21st-century Mexican women writers
21st-century Mexican novelists
1983 births
Living people